Krewe of Bacchus is a New Orleans Mardi Gras super krewe.

History and formation
The Krewe of Bacchus is an organization founded in 1968 by Owen Brennan, Jr.  as one of the first modern "superkrewes," defined by their size, spectacular floats, and celebrity riders.  It is named for Bacchus, the Roman god of wine.

Bacchus was the first krewe to have celebrities appear as part of the parade.  Past celebrities who have served as Bacchus include: Steve Guttenberg, Danny Kaye, William Shatner, Lorne Greene, Charlton Heston, Jackie Gleason, Bob Hope, New Orleans' own Pete Fountain, Phil Harris, Henry Winkler, Glen Campbell, Jon Lovitz, and more recently, Elijah Wood, Sean Astin, Michael Keaton, James Gandolfini, Gerald McRaney in 1992, Harry Connick, Jr. in 1993, Hulk Hogan in 2008, Val Kilmer in 2009, Drew Brees in 2010, Will Ferrell in 2012 and Jim Caviezel in 2017 and Jensen Ackles (whose wife, Danneel Ackles is a native of Lafayette and named after New Orleans' Danneel Street) in 2019.

Ron Howard's reign as Bacchus was canceled by the 1979 New Orleans Police Department strike which scuttled all official Mardi Gras parades within the city limits. His Happy Days co-star, Henry Winkler, reigned in 1977.

The only non-celebrity to reign as Bacchus was Sgt. John McKeel Jr. (1981), who was held captive for 444 days during the Iran Hostage Crisis with 51 others.

Membership
The 2020 Krewe included more than 1,600 members, and its parade featured 33 floats, including its signature floats:  the Bacchasaurus, a giant dinosaur;  the Bacchawhoppa, an equally large whale; Bacchagator, an enormous alligator; and Bacchatality, a 3-float procession made up of restaurateurs. The Baccha-Amore, a love themed float, was introduced in 2008. For the 50th Anniversary, the Krewe introduced two need signature floats: the BacchaKong Family and the Bacchaneer. In keeping with tradition, "Bacchus beads" and doubloons are thrown to revelers from the floats.

After a long absence from prime time television, Bacchus returned to the New Orleans airwaves in 2009, when NBC affiliate WDSU produced a five-hour live broadcast of the parade and ensuing party at New Orleans Morial Convention Center. The Bacchus Rendezvous, the krewe's ball, has been held at the Convention Center since 1994 after it was held at the now-demolished Rivergate Convention Center from 1969 to 1993.

Parade
The Krewe of Bacchus parades during the New Orleans Mardi Gras, on the Sunday evening before Mardi Gras.

Parade themes 

2022 From the Heart
2023 Throw Me Something Mister

Celebrity Monarchs 

 1969 Danny Kaye
1970 Raymond Burr
1971 Jim Nabors
1972 Phil Harris
1973 Bob Hope
1974 Glen Campbell
1975 Jackie Gleason
1976 Perry Como
1977 Henry Winkler
1978 Ed McMahon
1979 Ron Howard
1980 Pete Fountain
1981 Sgt. John McKeel, Jr. (of the Iran hostage crisis)
1982 Dom DeLuise
1983 Charlton Heston
1984 Kirk Douglas
1985 Lorne Greene
1986 John Ritter
1987 William Shatner
1988 Alan Thicke
1989 Billy Crystal
1990 Dennis Quaid
1991 Steve Guttenberg
1992 Gerald McRaney
1993 Harry Connick, Jr.
1994 Jean Claude Van-Damme
1995 John Larroquette
1996 Dick Clark
1997 Tom Arnold
1998 Drew Carey
1999 Jim Belushi
2000 Luke Perry
2001 Larry King
2002 Nicolas Cage
2003 Jon Lovitz
2004 Elijah Wood
2005 Sean Astin
2006 Michael Keaton
2007 James Gandolfini
2008 Hulk Hogan
2009 Val Kilmer
2010 Drew Brees
2011 Andy Garcia
2012 Will Ferrell
2013 G. W. Bailey
2014 Hugh Laurie
2015 John C. Reilly
2016 Anthony Mackie
2017 Jim Caviezel
2018 J. K. Simmons
2019 Jensen Ackles
2020 Robin Thicke
2021 The parade was canceled in 2021 due to the COVID-19 pandemic
2022 Josh Duhamel
2023 Adam Devine

References

External links

Mardi Gras in New Orleans